Kirsty MacKay (16 November 1986) is a goalkeeper for England national women's field hockey team.  She plays club hockey in the Investec Women's Hockey League for Bowdon Hightown.

Mackay also played for East Grinstead, for four seasons helping them to gain promotion into the Premier League in 2014/15 for the first time in their history. Mackay also helped the team to become National Indoor Finals Champions - 2016, 2019, qualifying for the European Indoor Championships in both years.

References

 East Grinstead Hockey Club Website

1986 births
Living people
English female field hockey players
Place of birth missing (living people)
Female field hockey goalkeepers